Peace River D is a regional district electoral area in the Peace River Regional District in northeastern British Columbia, Canada. It includes a large area in the southeast part of the district, generally south of the Peace River along the Alberta border.

According to the Canada 2001 Census:
Population: 5,857 (exclusive of any residents of Indian Reserves)
% Change (1996–2001): -2.7
Dwellings: 2,297
Area (km²): 11,671.81
Density (persons per km²): 0.5

Communities
Arras
Doe River
Farmington
Fellers Heights
Gundy
Kelly Lake
Rolla
South Taylor
Sunrise Valley
Sweetwater
Tomslake
Tower Lake
Tupper
Valleyview

Regional district electoral areas in British Columbia
Peace River Regional District